Perry Township is one of the twenty-two townships of Tuscarawas County, Ohio, United States. The 2010 census found 462 people in the township.

Geography
Located in the southeastern corner of the county, it borders the following townships:
Rush Township - north
Washington Township, Harrison County - northeast
Freeport Township, Harrison County - southeast
Washington Township, Guernsey County - south
Monroe Township, Guernsey County - southwest
Washington Township - west
Clay Township - northwest corner

No municipalities are located in Perry Township.

Name and history
It is one of twenty-six Perry Townships statewide.

Government
The township is governed by a three-member board of trustees, who are elected in November of odd-numbered years to a four-year term beginning on the following January 1. Two are elected in the year after the presidential election and one is elected in the year before it. There is also an elected township fiscal officer, who serves a four-year term beginning on April 1 of the year after the election, which is held in November of the year before the presidential election. Vacancies in the fiscal officership or on the board of trustees are filled by the remaining trustees.  The current trustees are Harry R. Allen, Greg Bear, and William Keeton, and the fiscal officer is Sandra Cappel.

References

External links
County website

Townships in Tuscarawas County, Ohio
Townships in Ohio